The 1964 NCAA Men's Soccer Tournament was the sixth organized men's college soccer tournament by the National Collegiate Athletic Association, to determine the top college soccer team in the United States. The Navy Midshipmen, in their second straight title game appearance, won their first title, defeating the Michigan State Spartans 1–0 in the final on December 5, 1964. 

In the title game, all-time lacrosse Hall of Famer Jimmy Lewis scored the game's only goal. Lewis was named the tournament outstanding player.

This tournament featured 15 teams, a drop down from 16 teams the previous year. The tournament final was played in Providence, Rhode Island.

Teams

Bracket

See also 
 1964 NAIA Soccer Championship

References 

Championship
NCAA Division I Men's Soccer Tournament seasons
NCAA
NCAA
NCAA Division I Men's Soccer Championship
NCAA Soccer Tournament